Rachelle Marie Lefèvre (born February 1, 1979) is a Canadian actress. She has starred in the television series Big Wolf on Campus and had recurring roles in What About Brian, Boston Legal, and Swingtown. She played the vampire Victoria in the first two films of the Twilight saga. In 2011, she starred in the ABC medical drama Off the Map, followed by the CBS series A Gifted Man (2011–2012) and Under the Dome (2013–2015).

Early life 
Lefevre was born in Montreal, Quebec, where she was raised by an English teacher father and a psychologist mother. Her father's family is originally from France and Northern Ireland, and her maternal grandparents are Jewish. Her stepfather is a rabbi. Lefevre was raised in a non-denominational household, and identifies as Jewish. She has three sisters and speaks both English and French, though she grew up mostly speaking English. Lefevre attended Centennial Academy, a private high school, and later studied creative arts at Dawson College. She studied theater for two summers at the Walnut Hill School in Natick, Massachusetts, and began a degree in education and literature at McGill University.

Career

Early acting career 
While working as a waitress at a sushi bar in Westmount, a regular customer, a Canadian television producer, overheard Lefevre telling the hostess that she wanted to be an actress. The producer got Lefevre her first audition, for a role in the sitcom Student Bodies. She didn't yet have a head shot, so she submitted a Polaroid picture. She didn't land the part but got a call back from the casting director, leading to a role in the Canadian TV series Big Wolf on Campus in 1999, playing Stacey Hanson. Lefevre continued attending McGill between shoots, but never finished a degree.

Lefevre appeared in the film Confessions of a Dangerous Mind, directed by George Clooney, in 2002. She appeared in the television movies Picking Up and Dropping Off with Scott Wolf, and See Jane Date, and had a role in the romantic comedy Hatley High in 2003. In 2004, she played Etta Place in the Calgary-filmed TV movie The Legend of Butch and Sundance. Lefevre moved to West Hollywood, California that year and appeared in the films Noel, directed by Chazz Palminteri and starring Penélope Cruz, and Head in the Clouds, also starring Cruz and Charlize Theron. In April 2004, Lefevre filmed the mystery-thriller The River King in Halifax, opposite Edward Burns.

Lefevre starred on the Fox sitcom Life on a Stick in 2005, playing Lily Ashton, a mall fast-food restaurant employee, and then appeared on the Fox series Pool Guys. She has guest-starred on numerous other TV series, including: Charmed, playing Olivia Callaway on the episode "Love's a Witch", playing Annie Isles in season five of Undressed, and appearing on the short-lived ABC series What About Brian for eleven episodes. Lefevre was cast as Annie Cartwright, the female lead in ABC's Life on Mars, a David E. Kelley remake of the original British TV series. She shot a pilot episode, but was replaced by Gretchen Mol when the series was revamped.

Twilight 
Lefevre played the renegade vampire Victoria in the film Twilight (2008), based on the novel of the same name by Stephenie Meyer. Lefevre wrote an impassioned letter to the director, explaining her desire to work with the filmmaker. Lefevre described the essence of her character as "pure evil, pure instinct, pure malice, and very feline". After reading that the author used the word "feline" to describe her character's agility, Lefevre watched lion attacks on YouTube to separate the movements of her character from those of normal people. She also took trapeze classes in preparation for the wire work in the film. Lefevre spent hours working on the costumes for her character, and described herself as "obsessed" with vampires after reading Bram Stoker's Dracula at the age of 14.

Lefevre was, at times, overwhelmed by the scrutiny she received from her involvement with Twilight. She participated in a promotional tour in November 2008, where she met and signed autographs for Twilight fans at Hot Topic stores in the U.S. "It's the closest I will ever come in my life to being a rock star," she told The Canadian Press, describing an appearance on MuchMusic, where over 1,500 fans showed up in Toronto. Over 2,500 fans showed up at a Wal-Mart in Salt Lake City, where Lefevre appeared to promote the DVD release of the film. Overall though, Lefevre described herself as delighted by the attention and excitement of the fans. She appeared in New Moon, the film's sequel, based on Meyer's second novel, which she completed shooting in Vancouver in May 2009.

Lefevre did not reprise her role of Victoria in Eclipse, the third film of the Twilight series, and was replaced by Bryce Dallas Howard. Summit Entertainment, the studio behind the films, attributed the change to scheduling conflicts; Eclipse and Barney's Version, an independent Canadian feature Lefevre had signed on to, both began filming on August 17, 2009. Lefevre responded that she was "stunned" by the decision and "greatly saddened" not to continue her portrayal of Victoria, and never thought she would "lose the role over a 10 day overlap", in a statement to Access Hollywood. The studio responded in a counter-statement, "The Twilight Saga: Eclipse is an ensemble production that has to accommodate the schedules of numerous actors while respecting the established creative vision of the filmmaker and most importantly the story." Lefevre had appeared at the 2009 San Diego Comic-Con to promote New Moon the weekend before she was replaced.

Enthusiastic fans of the series reacted to the news of Lefevre's replacement with online petitions urging her return, and "Bring Back Rachelle" became a top-trending topic on Twitter on the afternoon of July 29, 2009. Lefevre told Extra that she was "absolutely blown away" by support from fans, who also made her a tribute video on YouTube. Lefevre did not attend the Los Angeles premiere of New Moon, tweeting that the event "was just 2 emotional 4 me & I couldn't manage it." (sic)

2009–present 

In 2009, Lefevre appeared in the CBC Television miniseries The Summit, filmed in Ontario, and completed the film Casino Jack, starring Kevin Spacey. In Casino Jack, she plays Emily J. Miller, a former press secretary for U.S. congressman Tom DeLay, who helped convict lobbyist Jack Abramoff (Kevin Spacey) in a political scandal involving Native American tribes.

Lefevre appeared in Barney's Version, a film adaptation of the award-winning Canadian novel by Mordecai Richler. Lefevre plays Clara, a manic depressive feminist poet who becomes the first wife of protagonist Barney Panofsky (Paul Giamatti). Her scenes were filmed in Rome in August 2009. The production continued on location in Montreal and New York City. Soon after the shoot, in November 2009, Lefevre shot the suspense film The Caller in Puerto Rico along with actors Lorna Raver and Stephen Moyer. She replaced Brittany Murphy, who had exited the project.

Lefevre appeared in the pilot episode of the ABC drama series The Deep End on January 21, 2010. She starred in the drama series Off the Map as Dr. Ryan Clark, a young doctor working in a South American medical clinic. Developed by Grey's Anatomy creator Shonda Rhimes, the series was filmed in Hawaii, debuted on January 12, 2011 and ran for 13 episodes before being canceled. Lefevre was the voice of the 31st annual Genie Awards in March 2011, along with host William Shatner. She was also cast in the NBC pilot, Reconstruction (working title: The Crossing), a drama set during the American Civil War. Lefevre plays Anna, a widow who begins an affair with a soldier.

In 2011, Lefevre joined the cast of the CBS TV drama, A Gifted Man, playing a doctor. Beginning in June 2013, Lefevre starred in the CBS summer thriller, Under the Dome, based on the 2009 best-selling novel of the same name by Stephen King. Lefevre joined an ensemble cast. The series was filmed in Wilmington, North Carolina, which lasted for three seasons on the network ending in September 2015.

In 2017, Lefevre joined the cast of Global's critically acclaimed original TV series, Mary Kills People for Season 2, premiering in January 2018. The series stars Caroline Dhavernas as Mary. Lefevre plays Olivia, sister of a victim from Season 1, who attempts to blackmail Mary.

In 2019, she played the lead role of Madeline Scott in the Fox legal drama Proven Innocent. The show was cancelled after one season.

Personal life and charity work 
In 2009, Lefevre donated $100 to Susan G. Komen for The Cure, a breast cancer charity, for every 10,000 people who followed her on Twitter. She also launched an eBay auction for the charity School On Wheels in August 2009, which provides tutoring to homeless children in Southern California. Lefevre sold t-shirts and other merchandise signed by her fellow cast members from Twilight. She is also an active supporter of Best Friends Animal Society, appearing in a public service announcement on behalf of the organization in November 2009, urging the public to adopt their next pet. Lefevre is a socialist. She endorsed Senator Bernie Sanders for President in the 2016 U.S. presidential election.

She is married and has two children.

Filmography

Film

Television

References

External links 

 
 MTV.com interview

1979 births
20th-century Canadian actresses
21st-century Canadian actresses
Actresses from Montreal
Anglophone Quebec people
Canadian film actresses
Canadian people of French descent
Canadian people of Jewish descent
Canadian people of Northern Ireland descent
Canadian socialists
Canadian television actresses
Dawson College alumni
French Quebecers
Jewish Canadian actresses
Jewish socialists
Living people
McGill University Faculty of Education alumni